Zion's German Lutheran Church (Zion's Lutheran Church) is a historic church at 510 Pine Street in Trinidad, Colorado.

It was built in 1890 and was added to the National Register in 2006.

It is described in its NRHP nomination as:a distinctive red brick building with stone trim and a steeply-pitched, wood shingle roof. The building has decorative gabled trim, pointed-arch windows, buttressing, and a central tower/narthex with an elaborate roof and a round arched entry below a large rose window. Stylistically, the eclectic composition almost defies classification. Predominantly Victorian Gothic, the church also possesses elements of other styles from the Late Victorian era, including Romanesque Revival, the
Stick Style, and Queen Anne with some Germanic influences.

References

German-American culture in Colorado
Lutheran churches in Colorado
Churches on the National Register of Historic Places in Colorado
Victorian architecture in Colorado
Churches completed in 1890
Churches in Las Animas County, Colorado
National Register of Historic Places in Las Animas County, Colorado
1890 establishments in Colorado